Symmimetis kolopis is a moth in the family Geometridae. It is found on Borneo. The habitat consists of upper montane forests.

The length of the forewings is 10–11 mm. Adults are rufous brown with a paler, yellowish ground colour.

References

Moths described in 1997
Eupitheciini